Kentucky supplemental roads and rural secondary highways are the lesser two of the four functional classes of highways constructed and maintained by the Kentucky Transportation Cabinet, the state-level agency that constructs and maintains highways in Kentucky. The agency splits its inventory of state highway mileage into four categories:
The State Primary System includes Interstate Highways, Parkways, and other long-distance highways of statewide importance that connect the state's major cities, including much of the courses of Kentucky's U.S. Highways.
The State Secondary System includes highways of regional importance that connect the state's smaller urban centers, including those county seats not served by the state primary system.
The Rural Secondary System includes highways of local importance, such as farm-to-market roads and urban collectors.
Supplemental Roads are the set of highways not in the first three systems, including frontage roads, bypassed portions of other state highways, and rural roads that only serve their immediate area.

The same-numbered highway can comprise sections of road under different categories. This list contains descriptions of Supplemental Roads and highways in the Rural Secondary System numbered 600 to 699 that do not have portions within the State Primary and State Secondary systems.



Kentucky Route 600

Kentucky Route 600 is a  state highway in Muhlenberg County that runs from Kentucky Route 831 to Kentucky Route 171 northwest of Clifty.

Major intersections

Kentucky Route 601

Kentucky Route 601 is a  state highway in Muhlenberg County that runs from Kentucky Route 181 on the western Greenville city line to Kentucky Route 175 north of Graham via New Cypress.

Major intersections

Kentucky Route 602

Kentucky Route 602 is a  supplemental road in Central City in central Muhlenberg County. The highway begins at KY 277 (River Road) in the north of downtown. KY 602 heads north along an unnamed street and meets the western end of KY 3038 (Prison Road) before reaching its north end at KY 1031 (Second Street).

Major intersections

Kentucky Route 603

Kentucky Route 603 is a  supplemental road in Owensboro in central Daviess County. The highway begins just south of a diamond interchange with the Wendell Ford Expressway, which carries US 60 and US 231 around the south side of Owensboro; the road continues south as Pleasant Valley Road No. 1. KY 603 passes through an S-curve and expands to a four-lane divided highway. The highway crosses over a CSX rail line and reaches its northern terminus at Fourth Street; this intersection also serves as the western terminus of KY 144.

Major intersections

Kentucky Route 604

Kentucky Route 604 is a  supplemental road in Central City in central Muhlenberg County. The highway begins at US 431 (Second Street) just south of the U.S. Highway's four–loop ramp interchange with the Western Kentucky Parkway on the eastern edge of the city. KY 604 heads east and then turns north at Youngstown Road. The highway crosses over the parkway before reaching its north end at an acute intersection with US 62 (Everly Brothers Boulevard).

Major intersections

Kentucky Route 605

Kentucky Route 605 is a  state highway that runs from Kentucky Route 1183 and Manton Road at Manton to U.S. Route 62 in far northeastern Bardstown via Botland and Woodlawn.

Major intersections

Kentucky Route 606

Kentucky Route 606 is a  state highway in Nicholas County that runs from Bald Hill Road northeast of Barterville to U.S. Route 68 southwest of Ellisville.

Major intersections

Kentucky Route 607

Kentucky Route 607 is a  rural secondary highway in southern Owen County. The highway begins at US 127 south of Monterey. KY 607 heads east along New Columbus Road, which immediately crosses Cedar Creek and has a hairpin at New. The route intersects KY 227 (Georgetown Road) west of Fairbanks, east of which the highway crosses Caney Creek. KY 607 meets the southern end of KY 1883 (Slatin Road) and meets the eastern end of KY 2018 (Swope Natlee Road) at Natlee, where the route crosses Eagle Creek. The highway continues through New Columbus to its eastern terminus at KY 330 (Owenton Road) at the Owen–Grant county line.

Major intersections

Kentucky Route 608

Kentucky Route 608 is a  state highway that runs from Frogtown Road at the Owen-Scott county line southeast of Natlee to U.S. Route 25 south of Stonewall.

Major intersections

Kentucky Route 609

Kentucky Route 609 is a  state highway in Pendleton County that runs from Kentucky Route 159 at Concord to Kentucky Route 177 east of Meridian.

Major intersections

Kentucky Route 611

Kentucky Route 611 is a  state highway in Pike County that runs from Kentucky Route 195 at Lookout to U.S. Routes 23 and 119 east of Jonancy via Lookout.

Major intersections

Kentucky Route 612

Kentucky Route 612 is a  state highway in northeastern Pike County that runs from Kentucky Route 468 south of Rural to Kentucky Route 292 northeast of Turkey Creek via Turkey Creek.

Major intersections

Kentucky Route 613

Kentucky Route 613 is a  state highway in eastern Powell County that runs from Kentucky Routes 11 and 15 at Bowen to Forestry Road No. 23 at the Menifee County line northeast of Old Lombard.

Major intersections

Kentucky Route 615

Kentucky Route 615 is a  state highway in central Powell County that runs from Kentucky Route 213 at Morris to Kentucky Route 599 northwest of Bowen.

Major intersections

Kentucky Route 616

Kentucky Route 616 is a  state highway that runs from Kentucky Routes 1029 and 2505 northwest of Fairview to Kentucky Route 875 southwest of Germantown via Abigail.

Major intersections

Kentucky Route 617

Kentucky Route 617 is a  state highway in southwestern Robertson County that runs from U.S. Route 62 east of Kentontown to Kentucky Route 165 and Piqua Lane northwest of Piqua.

Major intersections

Kentucky Route 618

Kentucky Route 618 is a  state highway that runs from Kentucky Route 1781 at Broughtentown to Kentucky Route 1250 south of Spiro via Dog Walk and Quail.

Major intersections

Kentucky Route 619

Kentucky Route 619 is a  state highway in Russell County that runs from Kentucky Route 92 southeast of Montpelier to Kentucky Route 379 in downtown Russell Springs via Rose Crossroads and Jamestown.

Major intersections

Kentucky Route 621

Kentucky Route 621 is a  state highway in Simpson County that runs from Kentucky Route 103 southeast of Auburn to U.S. Route 31W north of Franklin.

Major intersections

Kentucky Route 623

Kentucky Route 623 is a  rural secondary highway in southwestern Spencer County. The highway begins at KY 48 (Highgrove Road) just north of the East Fork of Cox Creek, which forms the Spencer–Nelson county line. KY 623 heads north as Lilly Pike, which crosses the Salt River on its way to its north end at KY 44 (Mount Washington Road) east of Waterford.

Major intersections

Kentucky Route 624

Kentucky Route 624 is a  state highway in far northeastern Trigg County and far northwestern Christian County that runs from Kentucky Routes 124 and 126 in Cerulean to Kentucky Route 91 and Old Princeton Road southeast of Bainbridge.

Major intersections

Kentucky Route 625

Kentucky Route 625 is a  state highway in western Trimble County that runs to and from U.S. Route 421 via Mount Pleasant and Trout.Between Corn Creek Road and US-421 this route is closed to Trucks due to the tight switchbacks and narrow nature of the road.

Major intersections

Kentucky Route 626

Kentucky Route 626 is a  rural secondary highway in southeastern Butler County and western Warren County. The L-shaped highway begins at a three-legged intersection with KY 1153, which heads west as Berry's Lick Road and north as Sandy Creek Road. KY 626 heads east along Berry's Lick Road through Turnertown, also known as Berry's Lick. The highway crosses Flat Rock Branch of Muddy Creek and intersects KY 79 (Russellville Road) at Davis Crossroads. KY 626 crosses Neils Creek west of Sharer, where the route has a brief concurrency with KY 1083 (Sugar Grove Road). The highway crosses the Butler–Warren county line and continues east on Jackson Bridge Road. KY 626 crosses the Gasper River and turns north at its junction with KY 2632 (Hammet Hill Road). The highway joins US 231 (Morgantown Road) to cross back over the Gasper River and turns north onto Highland Church Road at Hadley. KY 626 crosses William H. Natcher Parkway; on either side of the parkway, the route meets the eastern ends of a pair of frontage roads, KY 6140 (Frontage Road) and KY 6139 (Clifty Creek Frontage Road) on the north. The highway reaches its eastern terminus at KY 1435 (Barren River Road) at Rockland.

Major intersections

Kentucky Route 628

Kentucky Route 628 is a  state highway in southwestern Whitley County that runs from a dead end along Wolf Creek northeast of Ayres to U.S. Route 25W and Stringtown Road in Pleasant View.

Major intersections

Kentucky Route 629

Kentucky Route 629 is a  state highway in far eastern Ohio County and western Breckinridge County that runs from Kentucky Route 54 southeast of Fordsville to Kentucky Route 992 southeast of Mattingly via Rockvale.

Major intersections

Kentucky Route 630

Kentucky Route 630 is a  state highway in northern Hopkins County and south central Webster County that runs from Kentucky Route 262 and John Hardy Road south of Manitou to Kentucky Route 132 on the eastern Dixon city line via Manitou and Vanderburg.

Major intersections

Kentucky Route 631

Kentucky Route 631 is a  rural secondary state highway in Grayson County that runs to and from Kentucky Route 54 east and southeast of Short Creek via Duff.

Kentucky Route 633

Kentucky Route 633 is a  supplemental state highway in far northwestern Adair County that runs from Cane Valley Road at the Taylor County line to Kentucky Route 55 and Cane Valley Church Road south of Coburg.

Kentucky Route 634

Kentucky Route 634 is a  rural secondary state highway in far northern Taylor County and far southern Marion County that runs from Kentucky Route 744 northwest of Spurlington to Kentucky Route 289 southwest of Jessietown.

Kentucky Route 636

Kentucky Route 636 is a  rural secondary highway in northeastern Spencer County and southeastern Shelby County. The highway begins at KY 248 (Briar Ridge Road) east of Taylorsville Lake. KY 636 heads north along Van Buren Road, which crosses Little Beech Creek on its way to Mount Eden, which sits on the Spencer–Shelby county line. The highway meets the eastern end of KY 1795 (Mill Road) on the Spencer County side and intersects KY 44 (Mount Eden Road) on the Shelby County side. KY 636 continues northeast as Back Creek Road, which crosses and briefly parallels another Little Beech Creek. The highway passes through Junte before reaching its northern terminus at KY 395 (Waddy Road) west of Harrisonville.

Major intersections

Kentucky Route 638

Kentucky Route 638 is a  rural secondary highway in northeastern Laurel County and western Clay County that runs from Kentucky Route 80 in eastern London to U.S. Route 421 and Kentucky Route 11 in far northern Manchester via McWhorter, Larue, Fogertown, and Grace.

Major intersections

Kentucky Route 639

Kentucky Route 639 is a  rural secondary highway in western Clinton County that runs from Kentucky Route 553 west of Shipley to Kentucky Route 734 northwest of Snow via Wago.

Major intersections

Kentucky Route 640

Kentucky Route 640 is a  rural secondary highway in western Metcalfe County. The highway begins at KY 90 (Summer Shade Road) at Summer Shade. KY 640 heads north along Randolph Summer Shade Road. The highway curves west and crossing Falling Timber Creek and meets the eastern end of KY 1330 (Kino Road) very close to the Metcalfe–Barren county line. KY 640 continues northeast to Randolph, where the route turns north at the north terminus of KY 2387 (Randolph Goodluck Road) and meets the west end of KY 861 (Randolph Road). KY 640 follows Wisdom Road north to its intersection with KY 3234 (Old Glasgow Road) just south of the route's underpass of the Cumberland Parkway. The highway continues as Wisdom Knob Lick Road through an intersection with US 68 (Glasgow Road) at Wisdom to its northern terminus at KY 70 (Sulphur Well Knob Lick Road) west of Knob Lick.

Major intersections

Kentucky Route 643

Kentucky Route 643 is a  rural secondary highway in eastern Lincoln County that runs from U.S. Route 27 and Kentucky Route 1247 south of Halls Gap to Kentucky Route 39 in downtown Crab Orchard via Ottenheim.

Major intersections

Kentucky Route 646

Kentucky Route 646 is a  rural secondary highway in western Montgomery County and far southeastern Clark County that runs from Kentucky Route 213 in far southern Jeffersonville to Kentucky Route 713 southeast of Mount Sterling via Trimble and Bogy-Chennault.

Major intersections

Kentucky Route 648

Kentucky Route 648 is a  supplemental state highway in far northeastern Bourbon County and northwestern Nicholas County that runs from Kentucky Route 1879 to U.S. Route 68 north of Millersburg.

Kentucky Route 649

Kentucky Route 649 is a  state highway in northern Elliott County that runs from Kentucky Route 504 east of Ault to Mobley Flats Road and Ibex Post Office Road northeast of Ibex via Beartown and Stark.

Major intersections

Kentucky Route 650

Kentucky Route 650 is a  rural secondary state highway in eastern Morgan County that runs from Kentucky Route 172 east of Lenox to Kentucky Route 755 southeast of The Ridge via Wells Creek, Bascom, and Faye.

Major intersections

Kentucky Route 651

Kentucky Route 651 is a  supplemental state highway in western Wolfe County that runs from a point along Sandy Ridge Road to Kentucky Route 15 southwest of Campton.

Major intersections

Kentucky Route 652

Kentucky Route 652 is a  state highway in far northeastern Nelson County and southwestern Spencer County that runs from Kentucky Route 48 in downtown Fairfield to Kentucky Route 55 south of Taylorsville.

Major intersections

Kentucky Route 653

Kentucky Route 653 is a  rural secondary state highway in southwestern Fulton County that runs from Kentucky Route 94 and Cotton Gin Road to Ash Log Road and Davis Road near Sassafras Ridge.

Major intersections

Kentucky Route 654

Kentucky Route 654 is a  rural secondary state highway in eastern Crittenden County that runs from Kentucky Route 120 at Tribune to Baker Hollow Road and Weston Road northwest of Mattoon via Mattoon.

Major intersections

Kentucky Route 655

Kentucky Route 655 is a  rural secondary highway in western Edmonson County. The C-shaped highway begins at KY 70 (Morgantown Road) northwest of Windyville. KY 655 follows Segal Road west across Gulf Creek and then south through Segal and east through Asphalt. The highway continues northeast to its terminus at KY 70 at Windyville.

Kentucky Route 656

Kentucky Route 656 is a  supplemental state highway in south central Meade County that runs from Kentucky Route 1238 to Kentucky Route 333 south of Garrett.

Kentucky Route 657

Kentucky Route 657 is a  rural secondary highway in far northeastern Daviess County and northwestern Hancock County that runs from Kentucky Route 1389 east of Scythia to Kentucky Route 334 and Pell Street in downtown Lewisport.

Major intersections

Kentucky Route 659

Kentucky Route 659 is a  rural secondary highway in eastern Taylor County that runs from Kentucky Route 70 east of Mannsville to KY 70 again along with Kentucky Route 1752 southwest of Bass.

Kentucky Route 660

Kentucky Route 660 is a  rural secondary highway in far southern Jefferson County and northeastern Bullitt County that runs from U.S. Route 31E to Kentucky Route 1319 north of Mt. Washington.

Kentucky Route 661

Kentucky Route 661 is a  rural secondary highway in far northeastern Daviess County and far northwestern Hancock County that runs from Kentucky Route 662 to Kentucky Route 657 northeast of Yelvington.

Kentucky Route 662

Kentucky Route 662 is a  rural secondary highway in northeastern Daviess County and far northwestern Hancock County that runs from Kentucky Route 405 in Yelvington to Kentucky Route 657 northeast of Yelvington.

Major intersections

Kentucky Route 663

Kentucky Route 663 is a  rural secondary state highway in southeastern Logan County that runs from U.S. Route 431 and Mortimer Road north of Adairville to Kentucky Route 103 south of Auburn via Schochoh and Corinth.

Major intersections

Kentucky Route 664

Kentucky Route 664 is a  rural secondary state highway in southeastern Logan County and southwestern Simpson County that runs from U.S. Route 431 northeast of Oakville to Kentucky Route 383 southwest of Franklin via Schochoh and Neosheo.

Major intersections

Kentucky Route 665

Kentucky Route 665 is a  rural secondary state highway in southwestern Simpson County that runs from Kentucky Route 664 to Kentucky Route 100 and George Taylor Road southeast of Middleton.

Kentucky Route 666

Kentucky Route 666 is a  supplemental state highway in northern Union County that runs from Kentucky Route 871 northeast of Raleigh to Kentucky Route 130 north of Chapman.

Major intersections

Kentucky Route 667

Kentucky Route 667 is a  supplemental state highway in western Union County that runs from Kentucky Routes 492 and 1508 in Dekoven to Kentucky Route 871 southeast of Raleigh via Curlew, Balckburn, and Raleigh.

Major intersections

Kentucky Route 668

Kentucky Route 668 is a  supplemental state highway in northwestern Union County that runs from Kentucky Route 667 to Kentucky Route 109 northwest of Henshaw.

Kentucky Route 669

Kentucky Route 669 is a  supplemental state highway in eastern Union County that runs from a point along East Market Street near St. Peter's Catholic Church in southeastern Waverly to Locust Lane and Yancy Greenwell Road southeast of Hitesville via Waverly.

Major intersections

Kentucky Route 671

Kentucky Route 671 is a  rural secondary state highway in southeastern Allen County that runs from Kentucky Route 100 at Oak Forest to Kentucky Route 98 southeast of Maynard.

Kentucky Route 672

Kentucky Route 672 is a  supplemental state highway in southeastern Caldwell County that runs from Kentucky Routes 126 and 128 southwest of Cobb to U.S. Route 62 southwest of Dawson Springs via Cobb.

Major intersections

Kentucky Route 674

Kentucky Route 674 is a  rural secondary state highway in northwestern Wayne County that runs from a point along Bugwood Road to Kentucky Route 92 northwest of Parnell.

Kentucky Route 677

Kentucky Route 677 is a  rural secondary state highway in northwestern Metcalfe County, far northeastern Barren County, and TBA that runs from Kentucky Route 314 southwest of Center to U.S. Route 31E northeast of Canmer via Three Springs, Monroe, and Defries.

Major intersections

Kentucky Route 678

Kentucky Route 678 is a  rural secondary highway in western and northern Monroe County. The L-shaped highway extends from KY 87 near Akersville north and east to KY 163 near Rockbridge. KY 678 begins at KY 87 (Akersville Road) north of Akersville and south of Fountain Run in southwestern Monroe County. The highway heads east along White Oak Ridge Road, which gradually curves north through intersections with KY 2509 (Deep Ford Road) and KY 100 (Fountain Run Road). KY 678 crosses Indian Creek and intersects KY 249 (Flippin Lamb Road) at Flippin. The highway continues along Stringtown Flippin Road, which follows Indian Creek to KY 2468 (Mud Lick Flippin Road) before veering north to cross Peter Creek west of Jeffrey. KY 678 crosses Boyd Creek and gradually curves northeast toward Mount Hermon, where the route has a very short concurrency with KY 63 (Old Glasgow Road). The highway continues east along Mount Hermon Road, which crosses Hackers Branch of Skaggs Creek and meets the northern end of KY 2452 (Sand Lick Road). KY 678 runs concurrently with KY 839 (Sulphur Lick Road) through Sulphur Lick. The highway's final segment is along Homer Bartley Road, which crosses Skaggs Creek before reaching the highway's terminus at KY 163 (Edmonton Road) south of Cyclone and north of Rockbridge.

Major intersections

Kentucky Route 679

Kentucky Route 681

Kentucky Route 681 is a  supplemental state highway in northwestern Fleming County that runs from Buchanan Road on the Nicholas County line to Kentucky Route 32 west of Cowan.

Kentucky Route 682

Kentucky Route 682 is a  rural secondary state highway in northern Adair County that runs from Kentucky Route 55 southeast of Coburg to Kentucky Route 2971 northwest of Absher via Kellyville.

Kentucky Route 685

Kentucky Route 685 is a  rural secondary highway in western Barren County. The highway begins at KY 1297 (Old Bowling Green Road) at Beckton. KY 685 heads north along Beckton Road, which crosses over the Cumberland Parkway just south of the highway's junction with US 68 and KY 80, which run concurrently along New Bowling Green Road. The route continues north along Stovall Road and intersects KY 2189 (Park City–Glasgow Road) just south of the route's grade crossing of the CSX-operated Glasgow Railway at Stovall. KY 685 meets the southern end of KY 2143 (Old Happy Valley Road) just west of the route's intersection with KY 90 (Happy Valley Road). The highway continues east and then north along Wilson Road to its end at KY 70 (Griderville Road) east of Cave City.

Major intersections

Kentucky Route 687

Kentucky Route 687 is a  rural secondary state highway in northeastern Laurel County and western Clay County that runs from Kentucky Route 472 southwest of Langnau to U.S. Route 421 and Kentucky Route 11 in downtown Manchester.

Major intersections

Kentucky Route 688

Kentucky Route 688 was a  rural secondary state highway in Crittenden County. It ran from US 641 and Kentucky Route 91 in Marion southwest via Chapel Hill Road to Reiters View Road, and turned east on Reiters View Road to US 641 and Kentucky Route 91 in Crayne. The highway was cancelled on May 14, 2002, and the road was given to Crittenden County.

Kentucky Route 689

Kentucky Route 689 is a  rural secondary state highway in northwestern Johnson County that runs from Kentucky Route 172 to Kentucky Route 1092 around and through Flatgap.

Major intersections

Kentucky Route 690

Kentucky Route 690 is a  rural secondary state highway in eastern Breckinridge County that runs from Kentucky Routes 79 and 259 in southern Westview to Kentucky Route 333 and Rosetta-Corners Road at Corners via Se Ree, Fairfield, and Custer.

Major intersections

Kentucky Route 691

Kentucky Route 691 is a  rural secondary state highway in central Cumberland County that runs from a dead end southwest of Ellington to Kentucky Route 90 west of Burkesville via Arat and Leslie.

Major intersections

Kentucky Route 692

Kentucky Route 692 is a  rural secondary state highway in east central Pulaski County that runs from Kentucky Route 192 east of Somerset to Kentucky Route 80 and Shopville Road southwest of Shopville via Grundy.

Kentucky Route 696

Kentucky Route 696 is a  rural secondary state highway in southeastern Clinton County and TBA that runs from U.S. Route 127 Business southeast of Albany to Kentucky Route 1009 northwest of Windy via Savage and Gapcreek.

Major intersections

Kentucky Route 697

Kentucky Route 697 is a  rural secondary state highway in southwestern Fleming County that runs from Kentucky Route 1336 south of Tilton to Kentucky Route 32 southeast of Flemingsburg via Bald Hill.

Major intersections

Kentucky Route 698

Kentucky Route 698 is a  rural secondary state highway in eastern Casey County and southwestern Lincoln County that runs from Kentucky Route 198 southwest of Mount Salem to U.S. Route 27 south of Stanford via New Salem, Geneva, Jumbo, and Miracle.

Major intersections

References

Supplemental 0500
0600